Bacopa rotundifolia is a species of water hyssop known as the disk water hyssop or round-leafed water hyssop, due to the shape of its leaves. This is an aquatic plant native to water bodies of the central United States and well known in other areas as an invasive weed of waterways. The round leaves are 1 to 3 centimeters wide and each has six longitudinal veins. The plant produces yellow-throated white flowers. The plant is in bloom during the fall, its fruit/seed abundance is medium and its seed spread rate is slow. The plant has no commercial use.

References

External links
Jepson Manual Treatment
Photo gallery

Plantaginaceae
Freshwater plants
Plants described in 1803
Flora of North America